The Pearl was an Australian bred Thoroughbred racehorse that won the 1871 Melbourne Cup by two lengths.

The Pearl is the equal biggest price winner of the Cup at odds of 100/1.  Other winners at these odds were Wotan (1936), Old Rowley (1940) and Prince of Penzance (2015).

References

Melbourne Cup winners
1866 racehorse births
Racehorses bred in Australia
Racehorses trained in Australia